HMS Cormorant was an  sloop launched at Chatham on 12 September 1877 and later the receiving ship at Gibraltar.  She was renamed Rooke in 1946 and broken up in 1949.

Design
The Osprey class were of composite construction, with wooden hulls over an iron frame. They were designed by the Chief Constructor, William Henry White and five were ordered. They had a crew complement of approximately 140 men.

Construction
Cormorant was laid down at Chatham Royal Dockyard in 1875 and launched on 12 September 1877. She was commissioned on 2 July 1878.

Operational history
The primary purpose of ships of the class was to maintain British naval dominance through trade protection, anti-slavery, and surveying.

On 21 May 1871, Cormorant ran into a vessel in the River Medway and was severely damaged. In 1879 she served on the Australia Station, and in April 1886 she was on the Pacific Station.  On 20 July 1887 she became the first vessel to use the newly built graving dock at the Esquimalt Royal Navy Dockyard.

Fate
Cormorant became a receiving ship at Gibraltar in 1889. Lieutenant Arthur Hope Fanshawe was appointed in command of the Cormorant and torpedo boats at Gibraltar on 7 March 1900. Lieutenant Claude Lionel Cumberlege was appointed in command during 1902. She became a flag ship when Rear-Admiral Sir William Acland hoisted his flag on board the Cormorant when he was appointed Admiral Superintendent of the Gibraltar dockyard in October 1902.

She was renamed HMS Rooke in 1946 and was scrapped in 1949, being broken up at Málaga.

References

Bibliography

External links

Osprey-class sloops
Ships built in Chatham
1877 ships
Victorian-era sloops of the United Kingdom
Maritime incidents in May 1878